The 2000 Toyota Princess Cup was a women's tennis tournament played on outdoor hard courts in Tokyo, Japan. It was part of Tier II of the 2000 WTA Tour. It was the fourth edition of the tournament and was held from 2 October through 8 October 2000. Second-seeded Serena Williams won the singles title and earned $87,000 first-prize money.

Finals

Singles

 Serena Williams defeated  Julie Halard-Decugis, 7–5, 6–1
 This was Williams' 3rd singles title of the year and the 8th of her career.

Doubles

 Julie Halard-Decugis /  Ai Sugiyama defeated  Nana Miyagi /  Paola Suárez, 6–0, 6–2

References

External links
 ITF tournament edition details
 WTA Tournament draws

Toyota Princess Cup
Toyota Princess Cup
Toyota
2000 in Japanese women's sport